Since Barbie's introduction as a teenage fashion model in 1959, the doll has been portrayed with many careers. Dolls are sold with sets of clothes and accessories that fit the career being portrayed. For example, the Lifeguard Barbie playset includes a Barbie, an outfit with shoes, a lifeguard chair, a dolphin, and a life preserver, while the Spanish Teacher Barbie includes a Barbie, an outfit with shoes, flashcards, a Spanish quiz, an easel, a notebook, a key chain, and a hairbrush. Each career is created to give children the option of exploring new careers and help them learn new things. For example, Barbie went to the moon, in 1965, before Neil Armstrong and Buzz Aldrin did in 1969. She even was an executive in 1963 when it was uncommon for females to be in that male-dominated field.

According to Mattel, Barbie has had over 200 careers, recently including more STEM fields.

By category

Arts and media 
 Actor (1977, re-released 2008 and 2022; Western Star 1980, 1988, Silver Screen 1994, 1999, Between Takes 2000, 2001, Hooray for Hollywood 2002, 2003, 2004, 2009, 2010, 2012, 2013)
 Artist (2008, 2012, 2018, 2022)
 Ballerina (1961, 1976, 1984, clothing pack 1995, 2006, 2009, 2010, 2012, 2014, 2015)
 Cake baker (2014, 2019)
 Chef (clothing pack 1991, clothing pack 1995, clothing pack 1996, 2010, 2019, 2020, clothing pack 2022)
 Bakery chef (2018, 2021)
 Cookie chef (2014)
 Cupcake chef (2015)
 Dessert chef (2013)
 Pancake chef (2012)
 Pasta chef (2021)
 Pastry chef (clothing pack 2014, 2023)
 Pizza chef (2009)
 Smoothie chef (2016)
 Spaghetti chef (2017)
 Sweet chef (2013)
 TV chef (2009)
 Circus performer (1995, 2010)
 Dancer (2011)
 Ballroom dancer (1991, 2014)
 Cabaret dancer (2007)
 Can-can dancer (2009, 2011)
 Rockette (1992)
 Showgirl (2008)
 Fashion designer (1960, re-released 1995; clothing pack 1992, 2001, 2002, 2012, clothing pack 2015, 2022)
 Fashion editor (1965, 2000)
 Fashion model (1959, Fashion Model Collection 2000–2020, Top Model 2008, I can be... Fashion Model 2012, 2022)
 Fashion trend forecaster (1999)
 Film director (2015)
 Film producer (2005)
 Floral designer (2012)
 Game show host (1987)
 Interior designer (2022)
 Make-up artist (Barbie loves MAC 2007, I can be... Makeup Artist 2013, 2022)
 Musician (2017, 2019, clothing pack 2020, clothing pack 2022)
 Bard (2004)
 Keyboardist (2021)
 Lute player (Japan-exclusive Barbie Styled by Yuming 2000)
 Pianist (playset 1989)
 Rock star/guitarist (1986, Barbie and the Beat 1989, 1998, 1999, 2010, 2013, 2015, 2021)
 Saxophonist (clothing pack 2018)
 Violinist (2013, clothing pack 2021)
 Music producer (2021)
 News anchor (2010, 2019)
 Photographer 
 Baby photographer (2008)
 Fashion photographer (2012)
 Pet photographer (2022)
 Photojournalist (2019, collaboration with National Geographic) 
 Rapper (1992)
 Singer (Solo in the Spotlight 1960, re-released 1990 and 1995; Barbie and the Rockers 1986, Japan-exclusive 1987, Barbie and the Sensations 1988, Bandstand Beauty 1996, 2002, 2013)
 Country Western singer (Country Western Star 1994, Country Rose 1997, Rising Star 1998, 1999)
 Jazz singer (2007)
 Lounge singer (2006)
 Pop singer (Pop Sensation 2002, Pop Icon 2010, Pop Star 2019)
 Stylist (2023)
 Hair stylist (2014, 2015, 2021)
 Wardrobe stylist (2023)
 TV news camerawoman (2018)

Business 
 Avon representative (1999)
 Babysitter (accessories only 1963, accessories only 1976, 2010, 2013, 2014, 2015)
 Bake shop worker (Japan-exclusive 1998, 2006)
 Beach snack stand worker (playset 1992, playset 2021)
 Business executive (clothing pack 1959, Career Girl 1963, re-released 2006; Day to Night 1985, re-released 2018; 1992, Working Woman 1999, clothing pack 2020, Barbie Rewind Career Girl 2021)
 Café worker (playset 1998)
 Candy and ice cream parlor worker (1988)
 Cashier
 McDonald's cashier (playset 1982, playset 1994, 2001)
 Pizza Hut cashier (playset 2001)
 See's Candies cashier (1999)
 Supermarket cashier (playset 1992)
 Chief Sustainability Officer (2022)
 Coffee shop worker (2020)
 Crepe shop worker (Japan-exclusive 1987)
 Department store worker
 Makeup department worker (playset only 1982)
 Fashion department worker (playset only 1982)
 Dog daycare owner (2019)
 Entrepreneur (2014)
 Farmer (2018, playset 2020, 2022)
 Chicken farmer (2019)
 Farmer's market stall owner (2022)
 Fashion boutique owner (2023)
 Florist (1999, 2021)
 Food truck operator (2020)
 Grocery store worker (2018)
 Ice cream cart owner (1987)
 Ice cream shop worker (1989, playset 1998, 2022)
 Mary Kay consultant (2003)
 Noodle bar worker (2020)
 Outdoor beauty store worker (Canada-exclusive 1999, 2002)
 Palmer's clothing store employee (Austria-exclusive 1996)
 Pet boutique owner (2008)
 Pet groomer (playset 1994, 2013, clothing pack 2020)
 Restaurant owner (Japan-exclusive 1990, 2021)
 Shopkeeper (Pioneer Shopkeeper 1996)
 Secretary (2007)
 Smoothie bar worker (2021)
 Waitress (2006, clothing pack 2012, 2017)
 Soda fountain waitress (Coca Cola Series 1998)

Education 
 Art teacher (2002, 2007, 2011, clothing pack 2013, 2020)
 Ballet teacher (2007, 2010, 2017)
 Cooking teacher (2010)
 English language teacher (2017)
 Music teacher (clothing pack 2012, 2014, 2019)
 School teacher (India-exclusive 1991, clothing pack 1993, 2006, My Favorite Career 2010, 2019, clothing pack 2021)
 Elementary school teacher (1995, 1997, 2000, 2007, 2008, 2010, 2011, 2012, 2013, 2015, 2018, 2022)
 Preschool teacher (playset 1997, 2009, I can be... Nursery School Teacher 2012)
 Science teacher (2021)
 Sign language teacher (1999)
 Spanish language teacher (2000)
 Student teacher (1965, re-issued 2009)
 Yoga teacher (2012)

Medicine 
 Animal rescuer (2016)
 Arctic animal rescuer (2012)
 Marine wildlife rescuer (2013)
 Panda rescuer (2022)
 Dentist (1997, 2003, 2010, 2015, 2019, 2023)
 Doctor (1988, 1993, Spain-exclusive José Carreras Doctora Barbie 1995, 1996, 2010, 2012, 2013, 2015, 2019, 2020, 2021)
Eye doctor (2015, 2017)
 Nurse (1961, re-issued 2009. Civil War Nurse 1995, 2006, My Favorite Career 2010, clothing pack 2011, 2012, 2014, clothing pack 2015, 2017)
 Paramedic (2021)
 Pediatrician (1995, playset 1996, Children's Doctor 2000, Baby Doctor 2001, Happy Family Baby Doctor 2003, Play All Day Baby Doctor 2006, I can be... Baby Doctor 2008, I can be... Kid Doctor 2010, I can be... Pediatric Doctor 2011, 2013, 2015, 2016, 2020)
 Surgeon (1973, re-released 2021)
 Veterinarian (1985, Brazil-exclusive 1992, clothing pack 1993, Pet Doctor 1996, Pet Doctor 2005, Play All Day Zoo Doctor 2006, I can be... Zoo Doctor 2008, I can be... Pony Doctor 2010, I can be... Pet Vet 2012, Panda Caretaker 2014, Zoo Doctor 2015, Farm Vet 2016, 2021)

Military 
 Army medic (1993)
 Paratrooper (2000)
 United States Air Force pilot (1991, 2001)
 United States Air Force Thunderbirds pilot (1993)
 United States Army officer (1989, Desert Storm 1992)
 United States Marine Corps sergeant (1991)
 United States Navy petty officer QM1 (1991)

Political 
 Campaign fundraiser (2020)
 Campaign manager (2020)
 UNICEF Ambassador (1989)
 United States Presidential candidate (1992, 2000, 2004, 2008, 2012, 2016)
 Vice presidential candidate (2016)

Public service 
 Canadian Mountie (1987, 2013)
 Detective (1999, 2014)
 Firefighter (clothing pack 1993, 1995, clothing pack 2011, 2015, 2021)
 Judge (2019)
 Lifeguard (Baywatch 1994, 2011, clothing pack 2014, 2015, 2021)
 Park ranger (2020)
 Police officer (1993, clothing pack 2011)

Science and engineering 
 Architect (2010)
 Astronaut (1965, 1985, 1994, clothing pack 1997, My Favorite Career 2010, clothing pack 2012, I can be... Mars Explorer 2013, clothing pack 2014, 2017, 2021)
 Astrophysicist (2019, collaboration with National Geographic)
 Chemist (2018)
 Computer engineer (Computer Engineer Barbie, 2010), (accompanying book pulled by Mattel in 2014)
 Conservation scientist (2022)
 Entomologist (2019, collaboration with National Geographic)
 Game developer (2016)
 Marine biologist (clothing pack 2012, 2022)
 Polar marine biologist (2019, collaboration with National Geographic)
 Microbiologist (2022)
 Renewable energy engineer (2022)
 Robotics engineer (2018)
 Paleontologist (1996, 2012)
 SeaWorld trainer (2009, 2013)
 Space scientist (2017)
 Wildlife conservationist (2019, collaboration with National Geographic)
 Zoologist (2021)

Sports and athletics 
 Aerobics instructor (1984)
 Baseball player (1993, 2018)
 Major League Baseball player (1998)
 Basketball player (2018)
 National Basketball Association player (1998)
 Women's National Basketball Association player (1998)
 Bowler (2000)
 Boxer (2020)
 Cheerleader (1963, clothing pack 1964, clothing pack 1992, Coca-Cola Cheerleader 2000, Pom Pom Divas 2006, Dallas Cowboys Cheerleader Barbie 2007, 2010, clothing pack 2011, 2013, 2014)
 Equestrienne (1976, clothing pack 2010)
 Figure skater (1990, 1996, 2000, clothing pack 2011, 2012, clothing pack 2014, 2015, clothing pack 2021, 2022)
 Figure skating coach (2019)
 Golfer (clothing pack 2018)
 Gymnast (1993, clothing pack 2011, 2012, 2015, 2020)
 Rhythmic gymnast (2017, 2021)
 Gymnastics coach (2009, 2013, 2016, 2019)
 Hockey player (Tim Hortons 2020, 2021)
 Martial artist (clothing pack 2012, 2017)
 Matador (1999)
 Olympic athlete 
 Olympic climber (2020)
 Olympic figure skater (1975, 1988, 1997, 2002)
 Olympic gymnast (1974, 1995)
 Olympic karate (2020)
 Olympic skateboarder (2020)
 Olympic skier (1975)
 Olympic softball player (2020)
 Olympic surfer (2020)
 Olympic swimmer (1975, re-released 2021; Australia-exclusive 1977, 2000)
 Scuba diver (1994)
 Skateboarder (2017)
 Skier (2011, 2012)
 Para alpine skier (2022)
 Snowboarder (2012, 2022)
 Soccer coach (2019)
 Soccer player (1998, Italy-exclusive A.C. Milan/Inter Milan 1999, 2011, 2013, 2014, 2015, 2022)
 Swimmer (2012, 2019)
 Swim teacher (2008)
 Tennis coach (2017)
 Tennis player (European Sports Star 1979, clothing pack 1997, 2012, 2014, 2020, 2022, 2023)
 Track-and-field runner (2012)
 Volleyball coach (2017)
 Volleyball player (2020, 2023)

Transportation 
 Aircraft engineer (2019)
 Carriage driver (1998)
 Flight attendant (American Airlines 1961–64, Pan Am 1966, United Airlines clothing pack 1973, Japan-exclusive Japan Airlines 1997, 2006, My Favorite Career 2010, clothing pack 2011, 2012, Virgin Atlantic 2019)
 Pilot (Flight Time 1989, India-exclusive Flight Time 1995, 1997, Airline Pilot 1999, clothing pack 2011, 2012, 2014, 2015, 2019, clothing pack 2021, 2022)
 Race car driver (2010)
 Formula One driver (Scuderia Ferrari 2000)
 NASCAR driver (1998, 1999)
 Tour guide (Toy Story 2 Tour Guide Special Edition 1999)
 African safari guide (clothing pack 1995)
 Train conductor (Travel Train Fun 2001)
 Train hostess (Travel Train Fun 2001)
 Travel agent (playset 1986)

Other roles 
 Bee keeper (2018)
 Candy striper (clothing pack 1964)
 Cat burglar (Barbie by Christian Louboutin 2009)
 Construction worker (clothing pack 2020)
 Cowgirl (1997, 2004)
 Dolphin trainer (2013)
 Drum majorette (1964, 2002)
 Jillaroo (1993)
 Magician (2013)
 Maid (Japan-exclusive 1987, 2006)
 Ocean treasure explorer (2013)
 Spy (Mystery Squad 2002, Spy Squad 2015)
 Starfleet security officer (1996)
 Superhero (Flying Hero 1995)
 Tooth fairy (2022)
 Usher (2007)
 Wild animal trainer (clothing pack 2010)
 Wilderness guide (2021)
 Zookeeper (2013)

By year

References

Careers
Mattel